Leeds Point (also known as Leeds) is an unincorporated community located within Galloway Township, Atlantic County, New Jersey. Leeds Point has a post office with ZIP code 08220, which opened on December 18, 1827. The town is named after the Leeds family, whose first American member, Daniel Leeds, Surveyor General of West Jersey around the beginning of the 18th century, after immigrating to New Jersey from the city of Leeds in England, claimed the land which now makes up Leeds Point; some of his descendants lived in Leeds Point from then on. (His descendants also include his son Daniel Leeds and grandson Titan Leeds, who in Philadelphia published one of America's first almanacs.)

The Jersey Devil was born in Leeds Point, according to one legend about the cryptid. The legend claims that in 1735, the thirteenth child of a Mrs. Leeds from the community was transformed into a demon shortly after its birth.

Demographics

References

Galloway Township, New Jersey
Unincorporated communities in Atlantic County, New Jersey
Unincorporated communities in New Jersey